Ramtanu Lahiri O Tatkalin Bangasamaj (Ramtanu Lahiri and Contemporary Bengali Society/The Life and Times of Ramtanu Lahiri) is a book authored by Sivanath Sastri. It is considered one of the most important historical documents relating to the period commonly known as the Bengali Renaissance. Though named after the social reformer Ramtanu Lahiri, it covers a broad historical period beginning with Ram Mohan Roy and including the Brahmos, Henry Louis Vivian Derozio and his Young Bengal movement and other such important historical events of contemporary Bengali society. In particular, it is the primary source of information on the Brahmo Samaj. An English version A History of Renaissance in Bengal – Ramtanu Lahiri: Brahman and Reformer, edited by Sir Roper Lethbridge, was published in London in 1907.

References 

Bengali-language literature
1903 books